Floyd E. Clack is a Michigan educator and politician who currently serves as a member of the Eastern Michigan University (EMU) board of regents. Among other offices he has served as a member of the Michigan House of Representatives.

Clack has an M.A. in Education from EMU in 1972.  He taught for many years in the Flint Public Schools and was also a guidance counselor in that school district.

Clack began his career as a politician with an election to the Flint City Council in 1979.  He served in that position until 1992 when he was elected to the Michigan House of Representatives.  He served in the Michigan house until 1996 when he was ineligible to run for reelection due to term limits. From 1996-2004 he served as a member of the Genesee County board of Commissioners. In 2005 he was appointed to the EMU Board of Regents by Governor Jennifer Granholm.

In 2003, Clack made an unsuccessful run for mayor of Flint. Clack was one of the Democrat contestants to run for the Michigan Senate District 27 in the 2006 election.

Clack's wife, Brenda Clack, also served in the state house.

Sources
plaque in the John W. Porter College of Education, Eastern Michigan University honoring Clack
Eastern Michigan University bio of Clack
Michigan Chronicle, Nov. 24, 2003
Legislator Details - Floyd E. Clack

Eastern Michigan University alumni
Members of the Michigan House of Representatives
Living people
African-American state legislators in Michigan
Politicians from Flint, Michigan
Michigan city council members
County commissioners in Michigan
Year of birth missing (living people)
20th-century American politicians
21st-century American politicians
20th-century African-American politicians
African-American men in politics
21st-century African-American politicians